Delicious may refer to:

Fruits
 Golden Delicious, a cultivar of apple
 Red Delicious, several cultivars of apple

Other
 Delicious (film), a 1931 Hollywood musical
 Delicious (TV series), a 2016 British TV series starring Dawn French
 Delicious (video game series), a series of casual games by Zylom Studios/GameHouse
 Delicious!, a 1996 manga by Yui
 Delicious (website) (formerly styled del.icio.us), a linklog service
 Vicious and Delicious, a professional wrestling tag-team
 Delicious (novel), a 2008 historical romance by Sherry Thomas

Music
 Delicious Vinyl, a record label

Albums
 Delicious (Thunderbugs album), 2000
 Delicious (Jeanette album), 2001
 Delicious, an album by Dreams Come True, 1995
 Delicious, an EP by Woo Jin-young, 2022

Songs
 "Delicious" (song), a 1994 song by Sleeper
 "Delicious", a 1958 novelty recording by Jim Backus
 "Delicious", a 1970 song by Linda Perhacs from Parallelograms
 "Delicious", a 1975 song by The Duprees
 "Delicious", a song by New Edition from their 1984 self-titled album
 "Delicious", a 1995 song by Shampoo
 "Delicious", a 2017 song by Charli XCX featuring Tommy Cash from Pop 2
 "Delicious", a 2021 song by Nick Jonas from Spaceman

See also
 
 Flavor (disambiguation)
 Deliciousness (TV series)
 Delicieux, a 2021 French film; see filmographer Nicolas Boukhrief